The Georgian Charter of Journalistic Ethics - an independent union of journalists aimed at raising the social responsibility of media through protection of professional and ethical standards, and development of self-regulation mechanisms.

The Charter’s Council is set up to consider complaints submitted against journalists, and decide whether or not any ethical principle has been violated in the issue in question. In addition, the organization implements various projects.

The Georgian Charter of Journalistic Ethics is a member of AIPCE (Alliance of Independent Press Councils of Europe).

History 
The organization was founded on December 4, 2009. 137  journalists  from various capital-based and regional media outlets signed to 11 principles, and took up the liability of their protection. The citizens, on the other hand, were given an opportunity to apply to the Charter in the case of violation of ethical standard in the journalistic material.

The Charter’s membership is ready to embrace any individual pursuing journalistic activity and sharing the Charter’s goals. The aspirants need to apply in writing to the Charter’s Council, which then makes the decision on the admission within a period no later than 2 months following the application.

Initially, the Council was solely considering claims submitted against the signee journalists, but the general meetings held in December, 2013 resolved the consideration of applications against the non-signee journalists as well. Consequently, the number of cases has been increasing since 2014, and as per the December 2016 data, 105 cases has already been considered.

The organizational structure has also been developing gradually. In 2012, Tamar Kordzaia was appointed executive director of the Charter, followed by the establishment of the Charter’s Secretariat, headed by David Kldiashvili. At the beginning of 2013, Tamar Kordzaia quit her post, and was substituted by Tamar Rukhadze, replaced by Nata Dzvelishvili in 2015.

Prior to the parliamentary elections of 2012, the Charter of Journalistic Ethics carried out a pre-election monitoring in conjunction with an established Slovak company Memo-98. The research targeted both the qualitative and quantitative data. Afterwards the Charter continued realizing various projects, as either a solitary effort or jointly with partner organizations.

Structure of the Charter

The Charter’s supreme managing body is represented by the general meeting of the Charter’s members, convoked by the Council in December every year, where the members introduce changes and additions to the Charter’s regulations, and consider various issues.

The Charter’s managing body is a nine-member council, elected by the signees at the general meeting. The Council members are selected through assignment of quotas: three members picked out from journalists /editors registered in Tbilisi, and 6 members out of journalists/editors registered outside Tbilisi.

The Council’s composition is updated on yearly basis by one-third. The Council elects its head for a period of one year. The Council meetings are held at least monthly, apart from situations when no cases have been prepared for consideration in the Council, with no other issues pending.

The Council appoints the executive director through a contest for one-year term. Control over the compliance with the Charter’s regulations and the spending of funds or other assets according to prescribed goals is realized by the Revision Commission of the Charter, composed of three members selected for a two-year term by the general meeting.  The Revision Commission then appoints its head within a month following its establishment, and follows its own set of rules.

Rule s for consideration of claims

Any natural person or legal entity is entitled to apply to the Charter concerning a journalistic violation. The proceedings are initiated by the Charter on the basis of claim submission, registered by the Secretariat of the Charter’s Council, and forwarded to the Council after checking of the formalities for the further decision.

The applications are examined at the public session of the Charter, with the participation of both the claimant and defendant.  Following the consideration of the case, the Charter takes a decision as to whether the principle specified by the claimant has been violated in the disputable material. The decisions are published on the Charter’s webpage.

Council
Nino Japiashvili (Indigo)
Maya Metskhvarishvili (Netgazeti.ge)
Geronti Kalichava (Livepress.ge)
Giorgi Mgeladze (Studio Monitor)
Jaba Ananaidze (TV 25)
Tamar Uchidze (Sknews.ge)
Tazo Kupreishvili (on.ge)
Tea Zibzibadze (Kutaisipost)
Maya Mamulashvili (Voice of Kakheti)

Chairman of the Board
2016–Current – Giorgi Mgeladze
2014–2016 – Nino Zuriashvili
2013–2014 – Natia Kuprashvili
2012–2013 – Giorgi Mgeladze
2011–2012 – Zviad Koridze
2009–2011 – Eter Turadze

Executive Director
2015–current – Nata Dzvelishvili
2013–2015 – Tamar Rukhadze
2012–2013 – Tamar Kordzaia

Charter’s Projects

Media-monitoring

The Charter of Journalistic Ethics has a group of monitors that has implemented a number of election, as well as thematic monitoring efforts since 2010:
Monitoring of parliamentary elections – 2012
Monitoring of presidential elections – 2013
Monitoring of crime coverage in media – 2012
Monitoring of children’s issues coverage in media – 2013
Monitoring of Open Society- Georgia Foundation projects – 2013
Coverage of children’s issues in media – stage II – 2014–2015
Coverage of gender-related topics in media – 2014
Media monitoring on Programming of the Public Service Broadcasters
Coverage of 2016 Parliamentary elections

Mediachecker.ge
Mediachecker is a media critique platform, established in 2013 within the framework of the “enhancement of the self-regulation of media through civil and legal education” project. The webpage provides the results of the analysis of the TV, online and press production. The group of monitors observes media outlets on a daily basis and prepares articles, short news and op-ed columns concerning the identified violations and deficiencies. Other civil society members have, meanwhile, an opportunity to express their opinion on media in the Blogs section.

Libcenter.ge
LibCenter has been functioning since 2013, and holds a contest twice a year for students’ participation in the project. The students selected are engaged in various activities during a period of 6 months- writing blogposts, news, preparing video-materials on the current events, and covering rallies. The project as well implies holding of public lectures and discussions with civil society over topics concerned with liberal and democratic values.

References

2009 establishments in Georgia (country)
Georgian journalism organisations
Self-regulatory organizations
Journalism ethics
Mass media complaints authorities
Law of Georgia (country)
Regulation